RECC may refer to:
 RecBCD, a bacterial enzyme complex 
 Reva Electric Car Company, one of the first companies to introduce electric vehicles worldwide